Guilhermina da Cruz (born 20 January 1970) is an Angolan sprinter. She competed in the women's 100 metres at the 1988 Summer Olympics.

References

External links
 

1970 births
Living people
Athletes (track and field) at the 1988 Summer Olympics
Athletes (track and field) at the 1996 Summer Olympics
Angolan female sprinters
Olympic athletes of Angola
World Athletics Championships athletes for Angola
Place of birth missing (living people)
Olympic female sprinters